Hare Plantation House is a historic plantation house located near Como, Hertford County, North Carolina. It is dated to about 1815 and is a two-story, three bay, gable-roofed frame dwelling with Greek Revival style design elements. It features a three bay pedimented porch, supported by four square columns.

It was listed on the National Register of Historic Places in 1971.

References

Plantation houses in North Carolina
Houses on the National Register of Historic Places in North Carolina
Greek Revival houses in North Carolina
Houses completed in 1815
Houses in Hertford County, North Carolina
National Register of Historic Places in Hertford County, North Carolina